Lyantor is a town in Surgutsky District of Khanty–Mansi Autonomous Okrug, Russia, located on the Pim River (Ob's tributary),  northeast of Khanty-Mansiysk, the administrative center of the autonomous okrug. Population:

History
It was established in 1967 in place of a fishing settlement of Pim due to discovery of oil and natural gas deposits in its vicinity. It was granted work settlement status in 1980 and town status in 1992.

Administrative and municipal status
Within the framework of administrative divisions, Lyantor is subordinated to Surgutsky District. As a municipal division, the town of Lyantor is incorporated within Surgutsky Municipal District as Lyantor Urban Settlement.

Economy
The economy is based on oil extraction.

References

Notes

Sources

External links
 Official website of Lyantor
 Unofficial website of Lyantor

Cities and towns in Khanty-Mansi Autonomous Okrug